Friedrich Wilhelm of Prussia  may refer to:

Prince Friedrich Wilhelm of Prussia
Frederick III, German Emperor
Friedrich Wilhelm III of Prussia
Friedrich Wilhelm III
Friedrich Wilhelm II of Prussia
Friedrich Wilhelm IV of Prussia
Friedrich Wilhelm I of Prussia